Groeneveld is a Dutch toponymic surname. Literally translated as "green field", the name may refer to someone living on or owning green fields or may indicate an origin in the villages Groeneveld or Groenveld. People with the name include:
 
Alexandra Kamp-Groeneveld (born 1966), German model and actress
Arnaut Groeneveld (born 1997), Dutch football midfielder
Daphne Groeneveld (born 1994), Dutch model
George Groeneveld (born 1941), Canadian politician
Ingrid Groeneveld (1921–2015), Dutch astronomer, namesake of the asteroid 1674 Groeneveld
Jan Groenveld (1945–2002), Australian critic of new religious movements
John Groenveldt (c.1647-1710), Dutch physician with a practice in England
Margaretha Groeneveld (born 1956), Dutch singer and television presenter known as "Marcha" or "Marga Bult"
Phil Groeneveld (born 1974), Canadian ice hockey goaltender
Reinier van Groeneveld (c.1588–1623), Dutch political figure, son of Johan van Oldenbarnevelt
Renee Groeneveld (born 1986), Dutch competitive sailor
Sara Groenevelt (died 1899), American pianist and litterateur 
Sven Groeneveld (born 1965), Dutch tennis player
Warren Groeneveld (born 1983), South African cricketer
Willem Groeneveld (born 1990), Namibian cricketer

See also
Groeneveld (disambiguation)
Anna-Lena Grönefeld (born 1985), German tennis player

References

Dutch-language surnames
Dutch toponymic surnames